Colva Mary Roney-Dougal is a British mathematician specializing in group theory and computational algebra. She is Professor of Pure Mathematics at the University of St Andrews, and the Director of the Centre for Interdisciplinary Research in Computational Algebra at St Andrews. She is also known for her popularization of mathematics on BBC radio shows, including appearances on In Our Time about the mathematics of Emmy Noether and Pierre-Simon Laplace and on The Infinite Monkey Cage about the nature of infinity and numbers in the real world.

Roney-Dougal completed her PhD at the University of London in 2001. Her dissertation, Permutation Groups with a Unique Non-diagonal Self-paired Orbital, was supervised by Peter Cameron.

With John Bray and Derek Holt, Roney-Dougal is the co-author of the book The Maximal Subgroups of the Low-Dimensional Finite Classical Groups (London Mathematical Society and Cambridge University Press, 2013).

In 2015 she was given the inaugural Cheryl E. Praeger Visiting Research Fellowship, funding her to visit the University of Western Australia.

References

Year of birth missing (living people)
Living people
British mathematicians
British women mathematicians
Group theorists
Mathematics popularizers
Alumni of the University of London
Academics of the University of St Andrews